The , formally known as the , is a  long railway line in Saitama and Chiba Prefectures operated by the Japanese private railway company Tobu Railway. It connects the satellite cities of Tokyo, such as Saitama, Kasukabe, Noda, Nagareyama, Matsudo, Kamagaya, Kashiwa, and Funabashi.

Description
Track
Double: Ōmiya - Kasukabe, Unga - Funabashi
Single: the rest

Operation
All trains were initially operated as all-stations "Local" services. Most trains, excluding a few from/to train depots, originate or terminate at Kashiwa Station which has a switchback. During the daytime, six trains run per hour.

From 26 March 2016, limited-stop "Express" services were introduced on the line. The journey time between Omiya and Kasukabe is reduced by 6 minutes compared with all-stations "Local" services.

Stations
Abbreviations:
 L = 
 S = 
 E =

Rolling stock
 8000 series 6-car (including 2+4-car) EMUs (since 3 June 1977)
 10030/10050 series 6-car EMUs (since 20 April 2013)
 60000 series 6-car EMUs (since 15 June 2013)

Trains are formed of 6-car (or 4+2-car) 8000 series EMUs, introduced from 1997. New 6-car 60000 series EMUs were introduced on the line from 15 June 2013, replacing the older 8000 series sets. Eight sets are scheduled to be delivered by the end of fiscal 2013.

From 3 March 2012, test running using 10030 series EMUs commenced on the line, with the first reliveried set entering revenue service from 20 April 2013.

From 21 April 2017, new Tobu 500 series three-car EMUs operate on Urban Park Liner limited express services on the line.

Former rolling stock
 1000 series 16 m long electric cars (1001–1004, 1101–1104,1201–1202), built in 1929 by Nippon Sharyo
 6300 series 20 m long electric cars (former JNR 63000 series), from March 1947 until 1950
 3200 series
 7800 series 20 m long electric cars, from February 1958
 7300 series 20 m long electric cars (rebuilt from 6300 series), from 1963
 3000 series 6-car (including 2+4-car) EMUs, rebuilt from 3200 series, from May 1965 until 1992
 5400 series EMUs, from November 1967 until 1972
 3050 series EMUs, rebuilt from 5400 series, from March 1971 until 1992
 3070 series EMUs, rebuilt from 5300 series, from 1974 until 1992
 5000 series 6-car (including 2+4-car) EMUs, rebuilt from 7800 series, from March 1983 until November 1994
 2080 series 6-car EMUs x2, from May 1988 until November 1992

History

In 1923, the line was privatized and the operator was named  (separate from the present Hokusō Railway), and also opened its own line from Funabashi Station to Kashiwa Station, a distance of 19.6 km (12 mi 14 ch).

The line was completed in 1930 with the completion of the bridge over the Edo River.

On 1 March 1944, the company merged with the Tobu Railway, and the line became the Tobu Noda Line. 6-car trains were introduced from November 1972.

Electrification was commenced in 1929 between Kasukabe and Ōmiya, and while the section from Kashiwa to Funabashi was still unelectrified when the operation of the line was taken over by Tobu in 1944, the remaining section was electrified by 1 March 1947.

The Omiya to Kasukabe section was double-tracked between 1957 and 2011, the Nodashi to Umesato section in 2011, the Unga to Sakasai section between 1960 and 1991, and the Mutsumi to Funabashi section between 1964 and 1999.

Six-car 8000 series EMUs were phased in from 1997, displaced by new 30000 series EMUs introduced on the Tobu Isesaki Line. The last remaining 5070 series EMUs were withdrawn from the start of the revised timetable on 19 October 2004, and the line's maximum speed was raised from 90 km/h to 100 km/h at the same time.

From 17 March 2012, station numbering was introduced on all Tobu lines, with Noda Line stations receiving numbers prefixed with the letters "TD".

See also
 List of railway lines in Japan

References

External links

 Tobu Urban Park Line information page 

Urban Park Line
Rail transport in Saitama Prefecture
Railway lines in Chiba Prefecture
Railway lines opened in 1911
1067 mm gauge railways in Japan
1911 establishments in Japan